This is a list of the first women lawyer(s) and judge(s) in Hawaii. It includes the year in which the women were admitted to practice law (in parentheses). Also included are women who achieved other distinctions such becoming the first in their state to graduate from law school or become a political figure.

Firsts in Hawaii's history

Law School 

 First Hawaiian Nisei female law graduate: Patsy Mink (1953) in 1951

Lawyers 

 First female (prior to overthrow of the Kingdom of Hawaii): Almeda Eliza Hitchcock (1888)  
 First female (sign the “Roll of Attorneys” for the federal district court): Elizabeth Helena Ryan (1896) in 1900 
First female (practicing in the Territory of Hawaii): Marguerite Kamehaokalani Ashford (1916) 
First Asian American female: Sau Ung Loo Chan (1942) 
First Japanese American female: Patsy Mink (1953)

State judges 

 First female (Commissioner of Private Ways and Water Rights): Emma Kaili Metcalf Beckley Nakuina from 1892-1907
 First female (Hawaii Supreme Court): Carrick Hume Buck (1921) in 1935 
First female (district magistrate): Edna Jenkins in 1937 
 First female: Carrick Hume Buck (1921) in 1934 
 First Asian American female: Marybeth Yuen Maul circa 1957 
 First female (appointed; Supreme Court of Hawaii): Rhoda Valentine Lewis (c. 1929) in 1959 
 First female (family court): Betty Vitousek in 1970
 First female (circuit court): Marie Milks in 1984 
First African American female: Sandra A. Simms in 1991 

 First female (Second Circuit Court): Harriet L. Holt in 1990 

 First openly lesbian female (Hawaii Supreme Court): Sabrina McKenna (1982): (2011)

Federal judges 
First Asian American female (U.S. District Court for the District of Hawaii): Susan Oki Mollway (1981) in 1998

Attorney General of Hawaii 

Corinne K.A. Watanabe (1974): First female to serve as the Attorney General of Hawaii, though for a partial term (1985-1987)
Margery Bronster (1982): First female to serve a full term as the Attorney General of Hawaii (1995-1999)

United States Attorney 

First female: Florence T. Nakakuni in 2009

Assistant United States Attorney 

 First female: Carrick Hume Buck (1921) in 1925

Political Office 

First Asian-born (Japanese descent) female (senator): Mazie Hirono (1978) in 2012

Hawaii Bar Association 

 First female president: Sherry Broder (1975)

Firsts in local history 
Carrick Hume Buck (1921): First female to serve as the Assistant District Attorney and Deputy City and County Attorney for Honolulu City-County, Hawaii (1925)
Jean Vaughan Gilbert (1944): First female to serve as the Honolulu City-County Attorney
Camille A. Nelson: First (African American) female to serve as the Dean of the University of Hawaii’s William S. Richardson School of Law (2020)
Edna Jenkins: First female to serve as the district magistrate for Makawao, Hawaii (1937) [Maui County, Hawaii]
Linda Breslau Berg: First female lawyer in Maui [Maui County, Hawaii]

See also 

 List of first women lawyers and judges in the United States
 Timeline of women lawyers in the United States
 Women in law

Other topics of interest 

 List of first minority male lawyers and judges in the United States
 List of first minority male lawyers and judges in Hawaii

References 

Lawyers, Hawaii, first
Hawaii, first
Women, Hawaii, first
Women, Hawaii, first
Women in Hawaii
Lists of people from Hawaii
Hawaii lawyers